Kim Hak-soon (born 1954) is a South Korean film director and screenwriter. Kim wrote and directed the naval thriller film Northern Limit Line (2015) which depicts a real-life naval skirmish with North Korea in June 2002. It drew more than 6 million viewers 29 days after its release on June 24, 2015, making it one of the top-grossing film in 2015.

Filmography 
Dandelion (short film, 2001) - director, screenwriter, producer, cinematographer
Rewind  (2003)  - director, screenwriter, planner
Kentucky Blues (short film, 2008) - producer, director
Abandoned (animation short, 2008) - screenwriter, director, editor, animator
Northern Limit Line (2015) - director, screenwriter, producer

Awards 
1991 Eastman Scholarship
2004 12th Chunsa Film Art Awards: Best New Director (Rewind)
2004 [Hawaii International Film Festival]: NETPAC Award ('Rewind')
2004 [Houston International Film Festival]: Special Jury Award ('Rewind')
2016 [Macao International Film Festival]: Gold Aries Award - Best Cinematography ('Northern Limit Line')
2016 [Houston International Film Festival]: Special Jury Award ('Northern Limit Line')
2016 [Korea Culture Entertainment Awards]: Best Film, Best Director ('Northern Limit Line')

References

External links 
 
 
 

1954 births
Living people
South Korean film directors
South Korean screenwriters